Hide photography is the use of a purpose-made construction, a hide, to hide from a photographic subject, usually an animal, to get closer than would normally be possible when the photographer is in full view. Many animals, especially wild birds and mammals, are wary of humans, and flee from their presence while still at a distance that would not normally allow a quality photograph to be obtained.

Hide photography

Aims of hide photography
The aim of hide photography is to allow the photographer to be in close proximity to the wild animal without alarming and making it flee, and thereby obtain photographs of the species in non-captive conditions. A good hide setup will enable the occupying photographer to take a large number of photos, without apparently affecting the wild animal's behavior, and to observe and graphically document natural or near-natural behavior in natural or near-natural surroundings.

Types of hide
Hides come in many shapes and sizes, which effectively depend on certain factors, such as fabrication costs, the materials or know-how available for their construction, the function required of them, the setting in which they are to be used, the prevailing environmental conditions, the behavior of the target animals, etc.

One of the simplest hides is a screen or camouflage netting covering a hollow space in a bush or between rocks, for example. Then there are so-called "pop-up" hides, which can be purchased ready made, as well as tents, or variations on this theme which can be fabricated and mounted with relative ease by the user. Larger hides can be made of stone, concrete blocks, bricks and mortar or wood. They can also be made by recycling things made originally for other functions such as the so-called "rubbish hide", the first commercial hide offered in Catalonia by Birding in Spain, made from a plastic rubbish container which was inverted, equipped with a one-way glass front and an entrance door. Other hides can be equipped with "sleeves" to minimize visible movement of camera lenses; tower hides have been erected to enable photography of birds in trees and on roofs; floating hides or raft hides are sometimes used to get closer to birds and other wildlife in freshwater habitats.

Commercial hides
With the advances in digital photography, commercial hide photography has become a reality and a growing phenomenon within the tourism and ecotourism sectors. More and more wildlife enthusiasts consider participating in organized wildlife or bird photo trips, where it is possible to use one or more commercially managed hides to obtain photos of attractive or emblematic species, which may be difficult or almost impossible to obtain otherwise. Currently, the main European countries with the greatest offer of commercial hides are Hungary, Finland, Bulgaria and Spain. The species that can usually be photographed from such hides include bears, wolves, wolverines, as well as eagles, vultures, owls, etc.

In Spain, the main species which can be photographed from commercial hides on a bird photo trip include lammergeier, little bustard, great bustard, Bonelli's eagle, griffon vulture, Egyptian vulture, black vulture, red kite, golden eagle, lesser kestrel, little owl and a number of plains birds.

Hide protocol
Depending on the species or site, it may be necessary for the photographer to occupy the hide before dawn and to leave it after sunset. This is the case with some species and in places where the photographer's approach and entrance to the hide cannot be disguised. With other hides it is possible for the photographer to be accompanied to the hide by a person who then leaves the site, leading the birds or mammals into the belief that there are no longer any humans in the vicinity.

References

External links
Bird photo trips by Birding in Spain

Photographic techniques